The scythe sword (Sensenschwert) was a type of single-edged sword of the German Renaissance, related to the Dussack. It consisted of the blade of a scythe to which a sword hilt was attached. Like the falx or falcata of antiquity, it was thus a curved sword with the cutting edge on the inside (as opposed to the scimitar or sabre type with the edge on the outside).

The only known surviving example of a true scythe sword (its blade being made from an actual scythe), is that of  Thomas Müntzer (1489–1525), kept in the Historical Museum, Dresden. This sword has a representation of a runic calendar incised on the blade. Demmin (1893) notes the existence of other sword blades of the early 16th century bearing runic calendars in Berlin, Vienna, Paris, Munich, Graz and Luxembourg.

It is possible that “scythe sword” may refer to the Thracian romphaia (Greek: ῥομφαία), most commonly a long curved blade with its cutting edge on the concave or inside edge with a piercing point, attached to a pole (wood handle) that's shorter than the blade.

The Thracian romphaia is often compared to a Dacian falx, a longer version of a romphaia.

The romphaia was a close-combat bladed weapon used by the Thracians as early as 350-400 BC.

The two-handed falx is clearly related to the Thracian rhomphaia. It is a derivative of both the sword and the spear, used by the Dacians.

Both the romphaia and dax weapons were made in one hand and two handed versions. Most surviving examples suggest the smaller shorter “one hand” type actually would have been “hand and a half”, where the second hand was used more as a lever to make strokes, thrusts, recoveries and angle of attack changes more rapid and fluid.

So, “scythe sword” could refer to a romphaia, or dax possibly.

See also
 Single-edged sword (disambiguation)

References

 Auguste Frédéric Demmin, Die Kriegswaffen in ihren geschichtlichen Entwickelungen (1893), 727–729.

External links
 Sensenschwert mit Runenkalender (drawing of sword) 1501–1520.

Renaissance-era swords
Single-edged swords
Runic inscriptions